Reuniting the Rubins is a 2010 film directed by Yoav Factor and starring Timothy Spall, Rhona Mitra, and James Callis.  The majority of the film was shot in Radlett, Hertfordshire, England and South Africa.

Plot
The film is a family comedy chronicling a reluctantly Jewish man (Timothy Spall) who tries to re-unite his dysfunctional family in time for the Jewish celebration of Pesach so as to appease his ailing mother Honor Blackman. Although they are all from the same family his estranged children hardly seem like they are from the same planet. He must reunite his son the capitalist James Callis, his daughter the eco-warrior Rhona Mitra, his son the Buddhist Monk, and his last son, a born again Rabbi.

Principal cast
Timothy Spall  as Lenny Rubins
James Callis  as Danny Rubins
Rhona Mitra  as Andie Rubins
Honor Blackman  as Gran Rubins
Hugh O'Conor  as Yona Rubins
Asier Newman  as Clarity Rubins
Loo Brealey  as Miri Rubins
Blake Harrison  as Nick 
Theo Stevenson as Jake Rubins
Eloise Derbyshire as young Andie Rubins
Anthony Cowan as Rabbi's student (extra)

Release
In September 2011, Monterey Media bought the United States distribution rights from Kaleidoscope Film Distribution.

Festivals
Reuniting the Rubins was selected to screen at the following festivals
Washington DC Jewish Film Festival 
East Bay Jewish Film Festival 
Broward County Jewish Film Festival 
Pioneer Valley Jewish Film Festival 
Miami Jewish Film Festival 
Worcester Jewish Film Festival 
Lenore Marwil Jewish Film Festival 
Grand Rapids Jewish Film Festival 
New Jersey Jewish Film Festival 
Cherry Hill Jewish Film Festival 
Westchester Jewish Film Festival

References

External links
 

2010 films
2010 comedy-drama films
British comedy-drama films
Films shot at Elstree Film Studios
Films about dysfunctional families
Films about Jews and Judaism
2010s English-language films
2010s British films